The Real Story is Sylvia's first independent album from her own label, Red Pony Records, and her first album in eleven years.

Track listing

Personnel
Sylvia - vocal harmony, vocals
John Mock - acoustic guitar, classical guitar, electric guitar, mandolin, string arrangements, tin whistle
Craig Bickhardt - acoustic guitar, vocal harmony
John Catchings - cello
David Davidson - violin
Randy Hardison - drums
Kirk Johnson - harmonica
Kenny Malone - drums
Matt McGee - bass
Richard McLaurin - lap steel guitar
Craig Nelson - acoustic bass
Clara Olson - violin
Tom Roady - congas, percussion, timbales
Lee Satterfield - vocal harmony
Steven Sheehan - acoustic guitar
Catherine Styron - piano
Kristin Wilkinson - viola

Production
John Mock: Producer
Sylvia: Producer

All track information and credits were taken from the CD liner notes.

References

External links
Sylvia Official Site

1996 albums
Sylvia (singer) albums
Red Pony Records albums